LGD-3303 is a drug which acts as a selective androgen receptor modulator (SARM), with good oral bioavailability. It is a selective agonist for the androgen receptor, producing functional selectivity with effective dissociation of anabolic and androgenic effects, acting as a partial agonist for androgenic effects, but a full agonist for anabolic effects. It has been investigated as a possible treatment for osteoporosis, and was shown in animal studies to enhance the effectiveness of a bisphosphonate drug.

References 

Indoles
Lactams
Organochlorides
Organofluorides
Selective androgen receptor modulators
Trifluoromethyl compounds